Funky Butt is an album by saxophonist Arnett Cobb which was recorded in 1980 and released on the Progressive label. The 2014 CD reissue included three additional alternate takes.

Reception

The AllMusic review by Scott Yanow stated "Arnett Cobb, a tenor from the 1940s who fused together some of the most exciting aspects of swing and early R&B, is in typically exuberant form on this quartet set ... Cobb is warm on the ballads but the stomps are what make this record most memorable".

Track listing
 "Jumpin' at the Woodside" (Count Basie) – 4:32
 "Satin Doll, (Duke Ellington, Billy Strayhorn, Johnny Mercer) – 5:56
 "Georgia on My Mind" (Hoagy Carmichael, Stuart Carroll) – 4:09
 "Funky Butt" – 5:48
 "I Got Rhythm" (George Gershwin, Ira Gershwin) – 6:25
 "September in the Rain" (Harry Warren, Al Dubin) – 5:53
 "Isfahan" (Strayhorn) – 6:10
 "Radium Springs Swings" (James Newton) – 4:46
 "Jumpin' at the Woodside" [Take 1] (Count Basie) – 4:27 Additional track on CD release
 "Funky Butt Blues" [Take 1] (Cobb) – 7:25 Additional track on CD release
 "I Got Rhythm" [Take 2] (Gershwin, Gershwin) – 4:34 Additional track on CD release

Personnel
Arnett Cobb – tenor saxophone
Derek Smith – piano
Ray Drummond – bass
Ronnie Bedford – drums

References

Progressive Records albums
Arnett Cobb albums
1981 albums